Lone Survivor is a 2013 war film based on the Marcus Luttrell book.

Lone Survivor may also refer to:

 Lone Survivor (book), a 2007 book by Marcus Luttrell with Patrick Robinson
 Lone Survivor Foundation, an organization founded by Marcus Luttrell
 Lone Survivor (video game), a 2012 survival horror video game, unrelated to the book and film
 A single indigenous man in Brazil, commonly called the "Man of the Hole", who was the last survivor of his tribe

See also 

 Sole Survivor (disambiguation)
 Survivor (disambiguation)
 Surviving (disambiguation)
 Lone (disambiguation)